Pseudonotoliparis rassi, the Rass' snailfish, is a species of snailfish native to the northwestern Pacific Ocean where it is known from the Boussole Strait in the Kuril Islands. This species grows to a length of  SL. This species is the only known member of its genus.

References

Liparidae
Monotypic fish genera
Fish described in 1991